Solar power in Virginia on rooftops is estimated to be capable of providing 32.4% of electricity used in Virginia using 28,500 MW of solar panels. Installing solar panels provides a 6.8% return on investment in Virginia, and a 5 kW array would return a profit of $16,041 over its 25 year life.

A feed-in tariff is available from the Tennessee Valley Authority, which pays $1,000 for signing up, plus the current rate for electricity plus $0.12/kWh for all generation. Systems are limited to from 0.5 kW to 50 kW. Payment is for 10 years. Payments are in the form of monthly credits to the consumers regular monthly bill and are paid monthly or annually at TVA's choice. Payments are for 10 years, and payment at retail can be extended for an additional 10 years. A standard offer program is available for systems from 50 kW to 1 MW, which pays from 4 to 6 cents/kWh above retail for the first 10 years. Net metering is available, but residential customers with from 10 to 20 kW arrays could pay a monthly "standby charge" of up to $60/month. As of December 2, 2011, only one customer in Virginia was a residential customer with an array of that size. Standby charges were implemented in California by two utilities until they were banned by the California PUC. Commercial customers with up to 500 kW can use net metering and are not subject to a standby charge. Credits are perpetually rolled over, and customers can request payment once a year at avoided cost. Best practices do not recommend any limits to net metering, either individually or aggregate, other than to the customers service entrance capacity, and perpetual roll over of kilowatt credits.

Net metering requires a bi-directional meter, but other than that is simply an accounting procedure, and is more easily discovered by the utility than requiring any sign-up or reporting, just as air conditioning use is discovered, and does not require any sign-up or reporting. At low levels of local generation there is no impact to the utility other than the change in recording and reporting. At high levels utilities need to contract with or provide storage or export/import of the excess electricity generation. Germany, with 26 GW of solar and 29 GW of wind, which exceeds Germany's peak load of 50 GW, has not reached the point where this is an issue. During the summer wind output is reduced, as is solar during the winter. Solar tends to make up all of the peak load during the summer. Virginia currently has two pumped hydro-storage facilities.

Virginia's largest solar array in 2014 was the 504 kW rooftop array located in Woodbridge. It was expected to produce 636,199 kWh of electricity each year. In 2015, Dominion Virginia Power announced the planning of a 20 MW facility to be built on 125 acres near Remington Power Station in Fauquier County.

Amazon has partnered with Dominion Virginia Power to construct the largest solar facility in the Mid-Atlantic in Accomack County on Virginia’s Eastern Shore. Amazon Solar Farm US East is an 80 MW facility developed by a solar energy company and purchased by Dominion.

Based on the projects announced and permitted, it is estimated that Virginia will have 188 MW of solar installed by the end of 2016 and an additional 198 MW installed by the end of 2017.

The Virginia Clean Economy Act of 2020 directs the construction of 16,100 MW of solar power and onshore wind by 2035, bringing the state's utility-delivered power to 100% renewable energy by 2045.

Statistics

See also

Wind power in Virginia
Solar power in the United States
Renewable energy in the United States

References

External links

Incentives and Policies
Most Expert Energy Solutions Company in Virginia 2022

Virginia
Energy in Virginia